Samuel Tanner (born 24 August 2000) is a New Zealand middle- and long-distance runner specialising in the 1500 metres. He is Māori; his iwi affiliation is Ngāpuhi. Tanner is the New Zealand indoor record holder for the 1500 metres.

Career
A former surfer, Tanner set a national indoor 1500 metres record of 3:34.74 in February 2020 to secure the automatic Olympic qualification mark in Staten Island, New York He was confirmed on the New Zealand team for the delayed 2020 Tokyo Olympics in April 2021. At the Games, he failed to make it beyond the heats with a time of 3:43.22.

In June 2022, Tanner won the Oceania Athletics Championships 1500 m title. The following month, he was eliminated in the semi-finals of the event at the World Championships held in Eugene, Oregon with a time of 3:36.32. In August, he finished sixth in the Birmingham Commonwealth Games men's 1500 m final, setting a new personal best of 3:31.34, an improvement of 3 seconds, and becoming the second-fastest New Zealander of all time over the distance behind Nick Willis.

On 28 January 2023, Tanner lowered his personal best time for the mile by 0.41 s to record 3:54.56 in regaining the New Zealand national title at the Cook's Classic in Whanganui. He improved his mile best time twice in the following two weeks with 3:52.85 and then 3:51.70, both indoors in the United States.

Personal bests
 800 metres – 1:48.35 (Christchurch 2022)
 1500 metres – 3:31.34 (Birmingham 2022)
 1500 metres indoor – 3:34.72 (New York, NY 2021) 
 One mile – 3:54.56 (Whanganui 2023)
 One mile indoor – 3:51.70 (New York, NY 2023)
 5000 metres – 13:32.74 (Auckland 2022)
 10,000 metres – 31:26.86 (Wellington 2018)

References

External links
 Washington Huskies bio
 
 
 
 

2000 births
Living people
New Zealand surfers
New Zealand male middle-distance runners
Olympic athletes of New Zealand
Athletes (track and field) at the 2020 Summer Olympics
Commonwealth Games competitors for New Zealand
Athletes (track and field) at the 2022 Commonwealth Games
Washington Huskies men's track and field athletes
New Zealand expatriate sportspeople in the United States
New Zealand Māori sportspeople
Sportspeople from Tauranga